This is a list of notable renewable energy organizations:

Associations

Bioenergy
 World Bioenergy Association
 Biomass Thermal Energy Council (BTEC)
 Pellet Fuels Institute

Geothermal energy
 Geothermal Energy Association
 Geothermal Rising
 Global Geothermal Alliance

Hydropower
 International Hydropower Association (IHA) (International)
 National Hydropower Association (US)

Renewable energy
 Agency for Non-conventional Energy and Rural Technology (ANERT), Kerala, India
 American Council on Renewable Energy
 American Solar Energy Society
Clean Energy States Alliance (CESA)
 EKOenergy
 Energy-Quest
 Environmental and Energy Study Institute
 EurObserv'ER
 European Renewable Energy Council 
 Green Power Forum
 International Renewable Energy Agency (IRENA)
 International Renewable Energy Alliance (REN Alliance)
 Office of Energy Efficiency and Renewable Energy
 Presidential Forum on Renewable Energy
 REN21
 Renewable and Appropriate Energy Laboratory
 Renewable Energy and Energy Efficiency Partnership (REEEP)
 RenewableUK
 Renewable Fuels Association
 Rocky Mountain Institute
 SustainableEnergy
 Trans-Mediterranean Renewable Energy Cooperation
 World Council for Renewable Energy
 The World Renewable Energy Association (WoREA)

Solar energy
 International Solar Alliance (ISA)
 International Solar Energy Society
 Solar Cookers International
 Solar Energy Industries Association (SEIA)
 Wadebridge Renewable Energy Network (WREN)

Wind energy
 American Wind Energy Association
 Citizen Partnerships for Offshore Wind (CPOW)
 Global Wind Energy Council
 WindEurope
 World Wind Energy Association

Educational and research institutions

Renewable energy
 Centre for Renewable Energy Systems Technology (CREST) at Loughborough University
 NaREC (UK National Renewable Energy Centre)
 National Renewable Energy Laboratory (NREL)
 RES - The School for Renewable Energy Science (University in Iceland and University in Akureyri)
 Norwegian Centre for Renewable Energy (SFFE) at NTNU, SINTEF.
 Centre for Alternative Technology (CAT)

Solar energy
 Clean Energy Institute (CEI) at the University of Washington
 Florida Solar Energy Center (FSEC)
 Plataforma Solar de Almería (PSA)

See also

List of countries by renewable electricity production
List of renewable energy topics by country
List of photovoltaics companies
List of large wind farms
List of environmental organizations
List of anti-nuclear groups
List of photovoltaics research institutes

Renewable
Organizations
 
Renewable energy commercialization